Seok Joo-myung (November 13, 1908 – October 6, 1950) was a Korean lepidopterist who made significant contributions to the taxonomy of the butterfly species of Korea. He was also a noted linguist and pacifist.

He was born in Pyongyang, North Korea, on November 13, 1908. His life had been tough during Japanese colonial era from 1910 to 1945 and a sudden attack took away his life on October 6, 1950. He graduated from Kaesong Songdo Higher Normal School in 1926 and then graduated from Kagoshima Higher Agriculture and Forestry School in Japan in 1929. In 1930, he a biology teacher at Songdo Middle School and worked there for 10 years. From that time, he dedicated his life to butterflies and Jeju research. Korean people call him Korean Fabre, lightening his brilliant achievements in the dark period.

Main scientific work
Japanese scientists said that there were 921 species of Korean butterflies but he made a great effort to collect 160 mil of cabbage butterflies throughout the Korean peninsular and compared their patterns and measured the length of front wings with a ruler by himself. He drew a conclusion that even though the wing patterns are different, they might not be different species and got rid of many wrong scientific names posted by Japanese prematurely and proved that they are individually changed adapting to surroundings and classified Chosun butterflies into 248 species. He longed for Chosun independence so he set the first stone for the classification of Chosun butterflies through his enormous samples he labeled butterflies Korean name and add seok. Especially he named an undiscovered butterfly the Fluttering Butterfly of the Jirisan Mountain for the first time in the world.

In 1940 A Synonymic list of butterflies of Korea was published by The Korea Branch of the Royal Asiatic Society. It was the first time for a Korean to be sponsored by the British Royal academy. After that, he was selected as a regular member of world entomology.
Throughout his entire life, he had collected 750,000 butterflies samples and sorted and marked the locations on the Korean maps and world maps each way. When the Korean War broke out, he tried hard to keep his samples and maps so he couldn't escape Seoul. Unfortunately, his collections were totally burnt. With his sister's brave efforts of carrying the maps on her back, the distribution maps of Korean butterflies by Sok, Chumyong, in 1973 was safely released in the world after his death. The book is made of 500 maps with red mark with accuracy. Due to his research of Korean butterflies, modern entomology on butterfly has been being studied by a great number of scholars in the field.

Later activities and death
He wrote a small dictionary Lernolibro de Esperato Kun Vortaeto 1947 because he was deeply involved in international peace movement to resist Japanese imperialism. He didn't change his Korean name into Japanese name until liberation. He voluntarily transferred to the Jeju natural medicine laboratory in Seogwipo, Jeju Island in 1943. While he had been working here for two years, he was fascinated by particularity of Jeju culture and absorbed in Jeju exploration. Six general books: Jeju dialect, Jeju population, Jeju document, Jeju essay, history of Jeju insect, and Jeju data, were published. These are valuable resources for Jeju study.

After liberation, he was in charge of zoology of the national museum. 
During the Korean War, he was mistaken as one of North Korea's People's Army and got shot by a drunken man, in front of a theater in Seoul while he was going to the national museum which was burnt by a bombing attack. It was said that just right before his death, he shouted "I know butterflies only!"

Jeju Studies

Relationship between Seok Jumyeong and Jeju Island
According to the historical records, Seok Jumyeong has visited Jeju-island three times. On his first visit, he went to catch butterflies for specimens from July 21st, 1936, for a month. This is recorded in his own book, Zephyrus, vol 7, page 150 to 174. Next Visit was for working 2 years at a Research Institute of Herbal Medicine attached to Keijō Imperial University( Hangul : 경성제국대학교 부속 생약 연구소 제주도시험장 ). This is called as the Research Institute for Subtropical Agriculture and Biotechnology Jeju National University in these days. He started working since April 24th, 1943 and left Jeju-island in May, 1945. The last visit in February, 1948, he went a travel of entire Jeju-island. This period of time gets a lot of meaning in his Jeju studies. Because this visit was right before 4․3 (April 3rd, 1948) Uprising in Jeju-island (Jeju uprising), so there were many traditional things of Jeju in nature and culture of Jeju Island at that period. Also, it was the prime peak of study in his life, it was the best time to collect data on the nature and humanities of Jeju-island.
By visiting Jeju-island three times, he had collected a lot of data about Jeju. Based on these data, he had left 17 books, more than 120 scholarly papers, and 180 articles (essays and articles). Among these, 6 books, and 27 scholarly papers, reports, essays are related to Jeju-island. He was both a globalist and a localist, and furthermore, he was a glocalist, naturally crossing over provinces and the world.

Jeju studies by Seok Jumyeong
He has stayed in Jeju Island from July 21, 1936 to August 22, 1936, collecting butterflies for a month. Zephyrus, vol.7, 1937 is the typical record of it. According to the records of that period, we could confirm that his interest wasn’t just the collection of butterflies, also the Jeju Island's urban and rural areas such as Gappa Island and Seop Island, and the nature of Jeju Island like 500 Generals, Halla Garden and Sanjung River.
On his second visit, Seok Jumyeong left Jeju Island in May 1945 and analyzed the data in Gaeseong and Seoul and organized it into six volumes of the Jeju Island series(제주도총서). The plan to publish the Jeju Island series is well documented in the preface of the "Jeju Island Data Collection," which he defected in June 1950.
Seok-Jumyeong wrote six books about Jeju Island. Of these books that have been issued since 1947, Jeju Island Dialect Vol. 1, Jeju Island Life Research Vol. 2, and Jeju Island-related Literature Vol. 3 were published by Seoul Newspaper during his lifetime. The purpose of this study is to review the significance of the publication of a series of studies on Jeju Island and the relationship between the book author"s Jeju Island studies and local research. Seok-Jumyeong read every resource on Jeju Island and thoroughly collected it in the course of writing his Jeju Island series.

Significance of Jeju Island series written by Seok Jumyeong
A look at the contents of this series indicates its consideration allowing us to get a wide knowledge of its field, as it provides collected and integrated resources pertaining to the same kind of knowledge regardless of any trace containing any resource. In addition, this series enables us to carry out comparative studies by arranging similarities or differences so that we can contrast them simultaneously. In the situation prior to 1950,when the concept of local research was not yet established in our country, a Jeju Island series by JuMyoung-Seok contributed to founding local studies into a single integrated body of knowledge now referred to as the "Jejudo Study."

References

1908 births
1950 deaths
Entomologists
Korean scientists
Korean Esperantists
20th-century zoologists
20th-century Korean scientists
Korean murder victims
Deaths by firearm in South Korea
Lepidopterists
People from Pyongyang